Lamport Hall in Lamport, Northamptonshire is a fine example of a Grade I Listed House. It was developed from a Tudor Manor but is now notable for its classical frontage. The Hall contains an outstanding collection of books, paintings and furniture. The building includes The High Room with a magnificent ceiling by William Smith. It also has a library with 16th-century volumes and an early 19th-century cabinet room with Neapolitan cabinets which depict mythological paintings on glass. It is open to the public.

Lamport Hall was the home of the Isham family from 1560 to 1976. Sir Charles Isham, 10th Baronet is credited with beginning the tradition of garden gnomes in the United Kingdom when he introduced a number of terracotta figures from (Germany) in the 1840s.

History

In 1568 John Isham, a wealthy wool merchant, built a manor house on the Lamport Estate. His grandson, also named John, became the first baronet in 1627 during the reign of Charles I. He extended the house considerably. However, the only remains of this structure is a section of the present stable wing.

It was Sir Justinian Isham who built the main existing building. In 1655 he commissioned John Webb, a pupil of Inigo Jones, to design a large two-story home. The next major additions were to the south-west front and the north. These were completed in 1741. The gates on the main road date from 1824 and were designed by Henry Hakewill

In 1842 further major rebuilding of the south east front was completed, and later Sir Charles Isham commissioned the building of a new façade with porch to the north-west front, which is now the distinctive main entrance to the Hall. This was completed in 1862. The tower was built about the same time.

By about 1950 the house had considerably deteriorated, and the then owner Sir Gyles Isham undertook major renovation works and allowed the ground floor to be opened to the public in 1974. When he died in 1976 he left the building and its contents to the Lamport Hall Preservation Trust, who care for the Hall and Gardens today.

In 2021 the hall trust caused controversy by advertising for musicians to perform for no fee at a dining event in the garden, although they did offer the musicians a hamper for performing.  The hall trust released an official apology which was well received by the professional music industry.  They have changed their policies and going forward will hopefully be a great example to other venues.

Sir Charles Isham

Charles Isham inherited Lamport Hall at about the age of 26 in 1846 when his elder brother Justinian died.  He had a particular interest in gardening and his garden featured in many of the journals of that day. Of particular interest to many of the journalists was the rockery which still exists today. Some of the descriptions of this feature were as follows.

In 1872 the Journal of Horticulture, Cottage Gardener and Country Gentleman made the following comment.

In 1897 the Gardeners Chronicle said

This rockery was particularly noted for the gnomes that it housed. The magazine called The Garden contained the following description of them.

Photos of the rockery and gnomes are shown in the gallery below.

One of the gnomes in this remarkable rockery survives and is on view at Lamport Hall today. A photo of the replica of this gnome is shown below.

The Library

In 1867 a number of rare volumes of Elizabethan prose and poetry were found in an attic. The story of the discovery was told on its centenary in the words of bookseller, Charles Edmond  who observed the discovery would "warm the heart of the most cold-blooded bibliomaniac." These included first editions bound in sheepskin by John Milton-- Paradise Lost and Paradise Regained.

See also 
Isham baronets

Image gallery: The rockery and gnomes in 1897

References

External links
Lamport Hall
Lamport Hall – Gardens Guide review

Houses completed in 1560
Country houses in Northamptonshire
Gardens in Northamptonshire
Grade I listed buildings in Northamptonshire
Grade I listed houses
Historic house museums in Northamptonshire